Supermercados Selectos is a Puerto Rican supermarket company. It is one of a number of well-known Puerto Rican supermarkets chains, along with Pueblo Supermarkets and others.

The company is not related to Supermercados Super Selectos of El Salvador.

History
The first four Supermercados Selectos stores opened in 1978, after Carlos Torres, a Puerto Rican businessman, took the initiative of organizing a number of small mom-and-pop ("colmado") stores group into one integrated company, in order to compete against larger supermarkets. (See certificate of incorporation.)  Another one of the chain's first owners was Ignacio Veloz Camejo, honorary president of Centro Unido de Detallistas de Puerto Rico since 1991.

In 1995, the chain was purchased by Edwin Ortiz.

By 2010, the chain operated a total of 32 stores. By 2014, the chain had reached 37 operating stores.

See also
Supermercados Econo - another Puerto Rican supermarket chain with a similar business model

References

External links

Retail companies established in 1978
Puerto Rican brands
Supermarkets of Puerto Rico
Food and drink companies of Puerto Rico
1978 establishments in Puerto Rico